The Baths of Zeuxippus were popular public baths in the city of Constantinople. They took their name because they were built on a site previously occupied by a temple of Zeus, on the earlier Greek Acropolis in Byzantion. Constructed between 100 and 200, the Baths of Zeuxippus were destroyed during the Nika revolt of 532 and then rebuilt several years later. They were famed primarily for the many statues inside them, representing prominent individuals from history and mythology.

Location 

The 12th-century scholar Zonaras claimed that Septimius Severus had connected the baths to the Hippodrome. However, Leontius, who was generally more accurate in his writings (which also predated those of Zonaras), asserted that the baths were not actually connected to the Hippodrome, but were simply close to it:

The Baths of Zeuxippus were also close (most probably adjacent) to the Great Palace grounds. This suggests their great popularity, since such a significant location would have attracted many people. The Baths were also close to the square of the Augustaeum and the basilica of Hagia Sophia.

The map to the right shows the Baths' approximate location within Constantinople, as determined by excavations. As can be seen, the Baths were roughly rectangular in shape, and were very close to, or even "connected" to the Palace, as Zonaras indicated.

Description 
The original baths, founded and built by Septimius Severus and decorated under Constantine I, were adorned with numerous mosaics and over eighty statues, depicting historical figures such as Homer, Hesiod, Plato, Aristotle, Julius Caesar, Demosthenes, Aeschines and Virgil, as well as gods and mythological heroes. These statues were gathered from various places in the empire, including Rome, Greece and Asia Minor. The decor of the Baths followed an architectural trend of the period; the Forum of Constantine, its adjacent Senate house, and the Palace of Lausus were adorned with similar statue galleries of heroes (mythological and not), historical figures and powerful people.

For a relatively small fee, any member of the public could gain admission to the bath complex. Although it was primarily used for public bathing, people could also exercise and enjoy a variety of recreational activities there. Attendants were paid to oversee the activities, enforcing opening and closing times and the rules of conduct. Men and women were not allowed to bathe together; they would either use separate baths, or bathe at different times of day.

Constantinople offered numerous bathhouses to its citizens, but the Baths of Zeuxippus were particularly popular. Even monks and members of the clergy could be seen there, despite the insistence of their superiors that the baths were places of impious behaviour.

Destruction and later use 
As a result of the Nika revolt of 532 - the worst uprising Constantinople had seen, which left half the city in ruins and thousands of people dead - the original Baths of Zeuxippus were destroyed in a fire. Justinian rebuilt the complex, but he could not recreate or restore the statues or the antiquities that were lost.

In the early 7th century, as a result of military and political pressure on the Byzantine Empire, public bathing changed from being a common luxury to a rare and infrequent one, and many public facilities and venues began to be used instead by the military. The last reference to the Baths of Zeuxippus being used for bathing occurred in 713, after which they were converted to other uses. Part of the bathhouse became a prison known as Noumera, while another part appears to have been used as a silk workshop.

Almost 1,000 years later, in 1556, the Ottoman architect Mimar Sinan built the Haseki Hürrem Sultan Hamamı on the same grounds. 

In 1927–1928, excavations on the site recovered many historical relics, such as earthenware and glazed pottery, which provided unique insights into the architectural designs and social interests of Constantinople. The most important objects found at the site were two statues inscribed with the words Hekabe and Aeschenes [sic] , giving rise to the theory that Christodorus of Coptus effectively wrote the six epigrams on the statues of the Baths, and lending further plausibility to the writings of Zonaras and Leontius.

In literature 
Christodorus of Coptus, an Egyptian poet and writer, wrote a lengthy (416 lines long) hexameter poem inspired by the statues adorning the Baths of Zeuxippus. The poem consisted of a number of short epigrams (six in total), each focusing on one or a small group of the statues, that were designed to form one work. While it has been suggested that these epigrams might have been inscribed on the bases of the statues themselves, this is unlikely because of his use of the ekphrastic medium, and the presence of the past tense in the text.

References

Sources

Bryan Ward-Perkins The Cambridge Ancient History: Empire and Successors, A.D. 425-600. Cambridge University Press, 2000.
John Bagnell Bury A History of the Later Roman Empire from Arcadius to Irene (395 A.D. -800 A.D.)  Adamant Media Corporation, 2005. 
Pierre Gilles The Antiquities of Constantinople. Italica Press, Incorporated, 1998. 
 
Marcus Louis Rautman Daily Life in the Byzantine Empire. Greenwood Press, 2006. 
Edward Gibbon The History of the Decline and Fall of the Roman Empire. Penguin Classics, 1995. 
Ralph Nickolson Wornum The epochs of painting characterized, a sketch of the history of painting, ancient and modern. 1847.
Pero Tafur Travels and Adventures 1435-1439 Routledge, 2004.
Scott Fitzgerald Johnson Greek Literature in Late Antiquity: Dynamism Didacticism Classicism Ashgate Publishing, Ltd., 2006. 
Karl Otfried Müller, Friedrich Gottlieb Welcker Ancient Art and Its Remains: Or, A Manual of the Archaeology of Art. 1852.
J. A. S. Evans  The Age of Justinian. 
Ferdinand Gregorovius, Annie Hamilton History of the City of Rome in the Middle Ages
William Matthews An historical and scientific description of the mode of supplying London with water. 1841

External links
3D reconstruction of the baths from Byzantium 1200
Christodorus' poem, in Greek and English

Buildings and structures completed in the 2nd century
Zeuxippus
Byzantine secular architecture
Constantinople
Ancient Byzantium
Byzantine culture
Byzantine baths